Qutab Pur is a village located in Najafgarh Tehsil of South West Delhi district in the Union Territory of Delhi in India. It is governed by Na Gram Panchayat.

Demographics 
The total geographical area of village is 144.5 hectares(2009). Qutab Pur has a total population of 26,275 peoples. The male and female populations are 14,287 and 11,988 respectively. There are about 5,204 houses in Qutab Pur village.

References 

Villages in South West Delhi district